José Carlos Fulgencio Pedro Regalado de la Riva-Agüero y Looz Corswarem (Brussels, Belgium, 25 May 1827 – Lima, Peru, 16 August 1881) was a Peruvian politician and diplomat.

He was the son of José de la Riva Agüero, Marquess of Montealegre de Aulestia, first President of Peru, and the Belgian princess Caroline-Arnoldine de Looz-Corswarem.

He studied at the Université de Louvain. In 1858, Riva-Agüero was elected Alternate Deputy of the Congress for Huarochirí and Deputy of the Constituent Congress two years after.

Member of the Civilista Party, was Minister of Finance in 1872, Minister of Foreign Affairs and member of the Senate of Peru. He served as Ambassador to Belgium, as well as to France.

References

1827 births
1881 deaths
Peruvian politicians
Peruvian people of Spanish descent
People from Lima
Peruvian Ministers of Economy and Finance
Foreign ministers of Peru
Riva Agüero family